The 2010–11 season was Falkirk's first season back in the Scottish First Division, having been relegated from the Scottish Premier League at the end of season 2009–10. Falkirk also competed in the Challenge Cup, League Cup and the Scottish Cup.

Summary
Falkirk finished third in their first season back in the First Division. They also reached the quarter-final of the League Cup, the fourth round of the Scottish Cup, and the first round of the Challenge Cup.

Results

Scottish First Division

Scottish Challenge Cup

Scottish League Cup

Scottish Cup

Squad

League table

References

Falkirk F.C. seasons
Falkirk